Netball Western Australia is the governing body for netball in Western Australia. It is affiliated to Netball Australia. It is responsible for organizing and managing West Coast Fever who compete in Suncorp Super Netball. It is also responsible for organizing and managing the West Australian Netball League as well as numerous other leagues and competitions for junior and youth teams.

History
In 1927, an early incarnation of Netball Western Australia, the Basket Ball Association of Perth was a founder member of Netball Australia.

Its headquarters are based at the State Netball Centre in Jolimont, Western Australia.

Representative teams

Current

Former

Competitions
 West Australian Netball League
 State Cup
 Regional Championships
 Association Championships
 Aboriginal Youth Gala Day
 Multicultural Carnival

References

External links
   Netball Western Australia on Facebook

 
Western Australia
Netball